Tahseen Said or Tahsin Beg Saied (b. 15 August 1933 in Baadre – d. 28 January 2019 in Hanover) was the hereditary leader (Mīr, or prince) of Yazidis. He was also the head of the Yazidi Supreme Spiritual Council and represented the Yazidis in all matters in respect of states and tribes. Although the historic base of the family is Ba'adra, Tahseen Said lived in the district capital, Ain Sifni.
  
He had a son named Hazim Tahsin Said.

Life
The Office of Mīr is hereditary and is transmitted from father to son, and Tahseen Said was the successor of his father Saied Beg, who died in 1944. He became Mîr at the age of 11.

Mīr Tahsin joined the Kurdish movement in 1969. He had an office in Choman area which is located north-east of Erbil. When Tord Wallström, a Swedish journalist, met him in 1974, Mir Tahsin stated his reason for participating in the Kurdish Revolt. He stated, “I believe in the principles of the revolt. However, there is no relation between the religion and the revolt. I am Kurdish, and all the Yezidis are Kurdish; this is the reason why I joined this revolt”. The journalist asked whether all the Yezidis are participating in the revolt, to which Mîr Tahsin responded: “No, but because their participation in the revolt has not been necessary as of yet. I've not requested their participation, but if I do, at least 95% will join the revolt. By the way, the government executed 20 Yazidis recently in Mosul”.

He travelled in 1975 after the Algiers Agreement led to the crushing of the Kurds' resistance.

During the 1991–2003 existence of the Kurdistan Region, he served as sub-ruler of the Yazidis in that territory. Mîr Tahseen survived an assassination attempt in 2004.

On 4 August 2014, he issued a plea to world leaders concerning the plight of the Yazidis being attacked by the Islamic State of Iraq and the Levant.

He died on 28 January 2019 in the Siloah hospital in Hanover. He was buried in Ain Sifni on 5 February 2019.

See also
 Khurto Hajji Ismail

References

External links
 Interview with the head of the Yazidi: Interview mit dem Oberhaupt der Yeziden - Mir Tahsin Saied Beg'' (April 1999). Yeziden.de 

Iraqi politicians
Iraqi Yazidis
1933 births
2019 deaths